Tyler Austin Eppler (born January 5, 1993) is an American professional baseball pitcher for the Fubon Guardians of the Chinese Professional Baseball League (CPBL). He previously played for the Orix Buffaloes of Nippon Professional Baseball (NPB).

Career

Pittsburgh Pirates
Eppler attended Navasota High School in Navasota, Texas, and played college baseball at Texarkana College and Sam Houston State University. The Pittsburgh Pirates selected Eppler in the sixth round of the 2014 Major League Baseball draft. He signed with the Pirates on June 11, 2014, for a signing bonus worth $200,000.

Eppler made his professional debut with the Jamestown Jammers, pitching in 14 games, posting a 2.49 ERA. He played 2015 with the Bradenton Marauders and Altoona Curve, going 6–2 with a 3.14 ERA in 15 games. After the season he played in the Arizona Fall League. He spent 2016 with Altoona, pitching to a 9–1 record and 3.99 ERA in a career high 162.1 innings pitched. He spent 2017 with the Indianapolis Indians, posting an 8–9 record with a 4.89 ERA. Eppler returned to the Indians in 2018, going 13–6 with a 3.59 ERA in 28 games (25 starts).

Orix Buffaloes
On January 15, 2019, the Orix Buffaloes purchased Eppler's contract from the Pirates. On December 2, 2019, he become free agent.

Washington Nationals
On January 9, 2020, Eppler signed a minor league deal with the Washington Nationals. Eppler did not play in a game in 2020 due to the cancellation of the minor league season because of the COVID-19 pandemic. In 2021, Eppler appeared in 19 games for the Triple-A Rochester Red Wings, posting a 7.75 ERA with 48 strikeouts. On August 24, 2021, Eppler was released by the Nationals.

Kiwoom Heroes
On December 17, 2021, Eppler signed a one-year, $400,000 deal with the Kiwoom Heroes of the KBO League. He became a free agent after the 2022 season.

Fubon Guardians
On January 5, 2023, Eppler signed with the Fubon Guardians of the Chinese Professional Baseball League.

Personal life
His younger brother, Shelton, plays quarterback for the Fundidores de Monterrey.

References

External links

Sam Houston State Bearkats bio

1993 births
Living people
American expatriate baseball players in Japan
Altoona Curve players
Baseball players from Texas
Bradenton Marauders players
Glendale Desert Dogs players
Indianapolis Indians players
Jamestown Jammers players
Nippon Professional Baseball pitchers
Orix Buffaloes players
People from Navasota, Texas
Rochester Red Wings players
Sam Houston Bearkats baseball players
Texarkana Bulldogs baseball players
Rochester Honkers players